Orenia marismortui is a Gram-negative, spore-forming, rod-shaped, anaerobic and motile bacterium from the genus of Orenia which has been isolated from sediments from the shore of the Dead Sea.

References

Clostridia
Bacteria described in 1988